City Sikhs (formerly City Sikhs Network) (Punjabi: ਸਿਟੀ ਸਿੱਖ) is a nonprofit organisation, and a registered charity which describes itself as "A voice for progressive Sikhs". It promotes networking, education and volunteering amongst Sikh professionals and provides a platform for engagement with the British Sikh community.

History

City Sikhs was launched in London in October 2010 by a group of Sikh professionals. The idea for the organisation came about after the founder of City Sikhs, Param Singh became friends with Dhruv Patel OBE, the founder of the City Hindus Network through a leadership training programme they both attended. In 2018, the organisation had over 7,000 members and was the largest Sikh organisation in the UK and Europe.

City Sikhs is a member of the Faiths Forum  and has worked with a variety of organisations including City Hindus Network, Deloitte Diversity Networks, National Sewa Day, the Faith and Belief Forum (formerly Three Faiths Forum), Limmud, the Islamic Society of Britain, and The Football Association

In 2021, Rita Chadha, who was the former Small Charities Coalition chief executive, was appointed as its first director.

City Sikhs' work

Some of the events that City Sikhs has organised include:

17 August 2011: "Sikhs, the City and Success", hosted by Barclays Wealth 
2 April 2012: "Mayoral Hustings in the City", hosted by Deloitte
17 October 2012: "Celebrating British Asian Sporting Success", hosted by Herbert Smith Freehills LLP
4 April 2013: "Recipes for Success", hosted by State Street Bank
31 July 2013: "Launch of the British Sikh Report", hosted by Ernst & Young
10 February 2014: "Women in Faith", co-hosted by St Paul's Cathedral
9 April 2015: "Hustings in the City", hosted by the Chartered Insurance Institute and co-organised with the City Hindus Network.
"Recipes for Success", hosted by UBS Bank in 2014, Lloyds Bank in 2016, BDO in 2017 and Parliament in 2018.
15 April 2019: The Grand Trunk Project and Faiths Forum for London in partnership with City Sikhs, City Hindus Network and the Association of Muslim Lawyers held an event in Parliament to commemorate 100 years on since the Jallianwala Bagh Massacre.
22 July 2019: The Faiths Forum for London in partnership with City Sikhs organised the parliamentary launch of the first South Asian Heritage Month
29 July 2019: City Sikhs in partnership with the Indian High Commission organised a photo exhibition on the life and philosophy of Guru Nanak Dev Ji as part of his global 550th birth anniversary celebrations.

City Sikhs supports interfaith initiatives such as the St George's Day Declaration and CAASE. City Sikhs has also supported British Sikh projects such as the Warrior Saints book, the British Sikh Report, and the Khanda Poppy Project

Members of City Sikhs have appeared on TV and radio and in print on a number of occasions to talk about Sikh or British Asian issues and are regular contributors to the BBC Asian Network and BBC1's The Big Questions.

Awards and nominations 
The City Sikhs team has been awarded a wide range of awards recognising both interfaith and community work, including:

 In the 2017 New Year Honours the Chairman, Jasvir Singh, received an OBE for services to faith communities and social cohesion in the UK. He became the youngest Sikh to receive this award.
In the 2018 New Year Honours, Onkardeep Singh, a founding trustee, received an MBE for services to faith communities and young people in the UK. He became the youngest person of South Asian heritage to receive this award.
In November 2018, Trustee Param Singh received an 'Inspirational Individual' award at Faith and Belief Forum Community Awards presented by the Lord Lieutenant for Greater London, Sir Ken Olisa OBE for services to the various faith communities in London.
In the 2019 New Year Honours, Param Singh, a founding trustee, received an MBE for services to charity.
In July 2019, City Sikhs was given the "Community Initiative of the Year" award  and the co-founder, Param Singh MBE, was named Man of the Year at the 7th British Indian Awards.
In September 2019, Onkardeep Singh MBE, a founding member, was awarded the prestigious Asian Achievers Award for community service at the 19th Asian Achievers Awards at Grosvenor House by Air Chief Marshall Michael Wigston of the Royal Air Force.

See also 
 Sikhism in the United Kingdom
 Sikhism in England
British Sikh Report

References

External links

Educational foundations
Political and economic research foundations
2010 establishments in the United Kingdom
Non-profit organisations based in the United Kingdom
Professional associations based in the United Kingdom
Business organisations based in the United Kingdom
Business organisations based in England
Industry trade groups based in England
Charities based in the United Kingdom
Business organisations based in London
Charity in Europe
Charities based in Europe
Cultural organizations based in Europe
Lists of organizations based in Europe
Development charities based in the United Kingdom
International organisations based in London
Organisations based in London
Political advocacy groups in the United Kingdom
Lobbying organisations in the United Kingdom
Public policy think tanks based in the United Kingdom
Human rights organisations based in the United Kingdom
Anti-racist organisations in the United Kingdom
Political advocacy groups in England
Charities based in Birmingham, West Midlands
Charities based in the West Midlands (county)
Clubs and societies in London
Cultural organisations based in London
Diaspora organisations based in London
Educational organisations based in London
Non-profit organisations based in London
Youth organisations based in London
Youth charities
Charities for young adults
Religious charities
Religion in London
Religious organisations based in London
Sikh organisations
Sikh political parties
Sikh politics
Sikh mass media
Sikh organisations based in the United Kingdom